Hailey Rhode Bieber (born November 22, 1996) is an American model, media personality, and socialite.  She has been featured in major ads for Guess, Ralph Lauren, and Tommy Hilfiger.

Early life and family

Hailey Rhode Baldwin was born in Tucson, Arizona, to actor Stephen Baldwin, the youngest of the Baldwin brothers, and graphic designer Kennya Deodato Baldwin. Her mother is a Brazilian of Italian and Portuguese descent, and her father is of English, Irish, Scottish, French, and German descent. Baldwin's maternal grandfather is the Brazilian musician Eumir Deodato. Baldwin was homeschooled as a child. She attended American Ballet Theatre in New York through her teen years. Baldwin was named after Halley's Comet.

Career

Modeling 

The first modeling agency Baldwin signed with was Ford Models, appearing in magazines such as Tatler, LOVE, V and i-D. Her first commercial campaign was for the clothing brand French Connection in the winter of 2014. In October 2014, Baldwin made her runway debut walking for Topshop and French fashion designer Sonia Rykiel. In December 2014, she was involved in a photo session for Love magazine, which also produced a short movie shot by photographer Daniel Jackson and released on the magazine's official YouTube channel.

In January 2015, Baldwin was photographed for American Vogue and in March for Teen Vogue. In April, she shot her first magazine cover for Jalouse Magazine alongside male model Lucky Blue Smith. In the same month she was involved in two further cover-shoots, for the Dutch edition of L'Officiel and the American edition of Wonderland Magazine and was also pictured in editorials for Miss Vogue and W magazines. In July 2015, she was featured in Ralph Lauren advertising alongside Australian singer Cody Simpson, and in October returned to the runway for Tommy Hilfiger and Philipp Plein.

In January 2016, Baldwin appeared in a Ralph Lauren campaign and shot an editorial for the Korean edition of Vogue. After walking again for Tommy Hilfiger in February, Baldwin featured in spring/summer campaigns for Philipp Plein and Tommy Hilfiger. In the same period she was also shot for Self Magazine and filmed for a commercial of clothing brand H&M, which was released in the Coachella Music Festival period in April. In March 2016, Bieber signed a contract with high-profile New York modeling agency IMG Models and in May appeared on the cover of Marie Claire, who described her as a "fresh face". The American cover was also released as the July cover of the Dutch edition of Marie Claire. In June, Baldwin walked for Moschino alongside high-profile supermodels such as Miranda Kerr, Alessandra Ambrosio, Jourdan Dunn and Chanel Iman and in the same month she also made her debut in advertising for Guess.

During the summer of 2016, Baldwin was photographed and filmed for an UGG footwear campaign, alongside supermodel Rosie Huntington-Whiteley. Along with Joan Smalls, Baldwin was also the face of Karl Lagerfeld's limited-edition North American clothing line entitled "Love from Paris". Baldwin also appeared in editorials for Glamour Magazine and Italian Vogue. In September, she took part in New York Fashion Week, walking for Tommy Hilfiger, Prabal Gurung, Jeremy Scott, Tory Burch and Matty Bovan. In London she made a personal appearance at a pre-London Fashion Week party at Stradivarius where she provided social media presence via selfies and tweets. She then walked for Julien Macdonald in LFW. During Milan Fashion Week Baldwin walked for Dolce & Gabbana and in Paris Fashion Week she walked for Elie Saab. Baldwin also appeared in advertising for Prabal Gurung Sport. Later that year she featured in campaigns for Guess' holiday collection and Australian label Sass & bide. In November 2016, Baldwin was on the cover of the Australian edition of Harper's Bazaar, and featured in a French Elle editorial.

In 2017, Baldwin was featured on the cover of Spanish Harper's Bazaar alongside male model Jon Kortajarena and the British edition of Elle. Baldwin also appeared in the promotion video for the Fyre Festival. She has since then stated that the money went towards charity. Baldwin appeared in the March 2018 issue of US Elle. In September 2018, Baldwin became a face of the Power of Good campaign for the Shiseido-owned make-up brand bareMinerals. Bieber became the face of Levi Jeans in 2019.

Other ventures

Acting and TV appearances 
In 2005, aged nine, Baldwin appeared by the side of her family in the television documentary Livin It: Unusual Suspects, and in 2009, she made an appearance in an episode of the TV show Saturday Night Live by the side of her uncle Alec Baldwin. In 2011, she appeared as Australian singer Cody Simpson's love interest in the music video of the song "On My Mind" as part of her early work and several years later, in 2016, she had a role in a second music video, "Love to Love You Baby" by French model and singer Baptiste Giabiconi, a cover of the Donna Summer song released in 1975.

Hosting 
On October 25, 2015, Baldwin worked as a TV host in a segment of the 2015 MTV Europe Music Awards in Milan, Italy. Alongside Italian supermodel Bianca Balti and English rapper Tinie Tempah she revealed the winner of the Best Music Video Award, won by Macklemore and Ryan Lewis for the video of their song "Downtown". On June 19, 2016, she co-hosted with model Gigi Hadid announcing a live exhibition by Shawn Mendes at the 2016 iHeartRadio Much Music Video Awards in Toronto, Canada.

Beginning on May 2, 2017, Baldwin began hosting a new TBS show Drop the Mic with rapper Method Man, featuring four celebrities facing off in a series of rap battles. As of 2020, the show had been broadcast for two seasons but had yet to be renewed or cancelled for season three.

Personal branding 
In 2016, Baldwin collaborated with clothing brand The Daily Edited, promoting a handbag capsule collection labeled as #theHAILEYedited collection. In the same year, she announced a collaboration with UK footwear brand Public Desire using the hashtag #PDxHB, and announced she would be launching her own make-up collection produced by Australian brand ModelCo.

In 2018, Bieber applied for and received a trademark on her name "Hailey Bieber" for commercial purposes. Her request to use the trademark Bieber Beauty was denied due to Justin Bieber having ownership of that trademark.

On June 15, 2022, Bieber launched a skincare brand, called Rhode.

Personal life 
Baldwin's first career aspiration was to become a professional classical ballet dancer, but her training ended due to a foot injury. She performed for the Miami City Ballet before her injury.

Baldwin was linked to Shawn Mendes in 2018, with the two making their first public appearance together that May at the Met Gala. Baldwin and Justin Bieber had briefly dated from December 2015 to January 2016, before splitting, then reconciled in June 2018. The couple got engaged in July 2018, and confirmed in November 2018 that they were married.

She resides in Cambridge, Ontario. The Biebers held a second wedding ceremony in South Carolina on September 30, 2019.

Bieber was raised as an Evangelical Christian and attends Churchome, the same church attended by her husband. On World Mental Health Day 2020, she endorsed Joe Biden for the United States presidential election. She had initially endorsed Senator Bernie Sanders for the Democratic nomination during the party's primaries in 2020.

In addition to English, Bieber speaks some Portuguese as her maternal side of the family is Brazilian.

Bieber is pro-choice. In May 2022, Bieber appeared alongside almost 160 other celebrities in a "Bans Off Our Bodies" full-page advertisement in the New York Times advocating for reproductive rights. Amidst the overturning Roe v. Wade the next month, she stated "what an extreme loss and disappointment. This is really really scary."

Health 
On March 12, 2022, Bieber was hospitalized with stroke-like symptoms. She was discharged the following day. In a 12-minute video she posted on her YouTube channel, she revealed she had suffered from a transient ischemic attack, caused by a patent foramen ovale and had surgery to remove said heart defect. 

In November 2022, she stated that she had an ovarian cyst "the size of an apple" on her ovary and she had had such cysts "a few times".

Filmography

Television

Music videos

Awards and nominations

References

External links 

1996 births
Living people
People from Tucson, Arizona
American people of Brazilian descent
American people of Italian descent
American people of Portuguese descent
American people of English descent
American people of French descent
American people of German descent
American people of Irish descent
American people of Scottish descent
American expatriates in Canada
Arizona Democrats
IMG Models models
Female models from Arizona
Television personalities from Arizona
Baldwin acting family
American Christians
21st-century American women
21st-century Christians
Justin Bieber
Brazilian models